The Blue Lias is a geological formation in southern, eastern and western England and parts of South Wales, part of the Lias Group. The Blue Lias consists of a sequence of limestone and shale layers, laid down in latest Triassic and early Jurassic times, between 195 and 200 million years ago. The Blue Lias is famous for its fossils, especially ammonites.

Its age corresponds to the Rhaetian to lower Sinemurian stages of the geological timescale, thus fully including the Hettangian stage. It is the lowest of the three divisions of the Lower Jurassic period and, as such, is also given the name Lower Lias. Stratigraphically it can be subdivided into three members: the Wilmcote Limestone, Saltford Shale and Rugby Limestone.

Lithology and facies
The Blue Lias comprises decimetre scale alternations of argillaceous limestone and mudstone. These alternations are caused by short-term climatic variations during the Early Jurassic attributed to orbital forcing (Milankovitch cycles). These limestone-mudstone alternations pass up into a clay member formerly known as the Lower Lias Clay now the Charmouth Mudstone. This lithology consists of monotonous mudstones weathering to clay at the surface. Sparse thin limestone and nodule bands are seen where the rocks are exposed. The deposition of a clay-rich mudstone member normally indicates deposition in a deeper marine environment. The lowest beds of the formation are referred to as the "Pre-planorbis beds" in reference them being deposited before the first appearance of the ammonite Psiloceras planorbis.

Wilmcote Limestone
In certain restricted parts of Britain, the lowermost member of the Blue Lias is the Wilmcote Limestone. It lies above the Cotham Member of the Lilstock Formation and beneath the Saltford Shale Member. The Wilmcote Limestone of central England was formerly quarried close to Stratford-upon-Avon, for example at Wilmcote, Temple Grafton and Binton. It is roughly 200 million years old, dating back to the dawn of the Jurassic Period.

Much of the Wilmcote Limestone is very fine-grained, blue-grey when fresh, and very finely layered. Fossils are quite rare, except in the lowest beds. It was formerly used for a variety of purposes, including walling, building, paving, gravestones, cement-making and as a source of agricultural lime. It is no longer quarried, and most of the old quarries are either infilled or overgrown.

Geologists think that the Wilmcote Limestone originated as layers of fine-grained mud on the floor of a sheltered, shallow muddy sea or lagoon that covered parts of central England at the dawn of the Jurassic Period. Very little life could tolerate the stagnant conditions on the seabed. As a consequence the mud was seldom disturbed, which is why the fine, paper-like layering is preserved.

Above the sea bed, the shallower waters supported ammonites, fish, and marine reptiles (ichthyosaurs and plesiosaurs). Their remains were discovered in the Wilmcote Limestone quarries during the nineteenth century. The Warwickshire Museum houses a collection of these fossils and some are on display at the Market Hall Museum in Warwick.

Occurrence
The Blue Lias is a prevalent feature of the cliffs around Lyme Regis and Charmouth, on the Jurassic Coast in Dorset, where it exists in layers of limestone interspersed with softer clay. It is also notable for its presence in Somerset, particularly around the Polden Hills, Keinton Mandeville and Glastonbury area, and it forms a broad plain across the East Midlands.  It also appears near Whitby in Yorkshire and Southam in Warwickshire where a pub is named after it.  There are outcrops along the coast of South Wales, notably that of the Vale of Glamorgan.<ref>Wilson et al., 1990 Geology of the South Wales Coalfield, Part VI, the country around Bridgend Mem Br Geol Surv sheet 261 & 262 (England and Wales)</ref> The type section of the Blue Lias is at Saltford near Bath.

Use in construction

Blue Lias is useful as a building stone, and as a source of lime for making lime mortar. Because it is argillaceous, the lime is hydraulic.  Since the mid-nineteenth century, it has been used as a raw material for cement, in South Wales, Somerset, Warwickshire, and Leicestershire.  The cement plant quarry at Rugby, Warwickshire is probably the best exposure of the formation: more than 100 layers can be seen.

In areas where Blue Lias is quarried it has been used in buildings and churches as well as tombstones in cemeteries. An example of a Blue Lias town'' is Street, near Glastonbury. Other examples of Blue Lias buildings can be found in the nearby towns of Somerton and Ilchester.

It remains popular in more modern-day surroundings where it is used in the construction of new housing developments and extensions for existing buildings in conservation areas. Blue Lias is mainly used in flooring, walling and paving slabs – both coursed and layered. It is also used in the making of flagstones and cobbles.

There are only four quarries in Somerset quarrying Blue Lias at present. AR Purnell at Ashen Cross Quarry in Somerton have been mining blue lias stone since 1996. Hadspen Quarry Ltd. Hadspen Quarry operate one in Keinton Mandeville. Ham & Doulting Stone Co Ltd. operate one of these, Tout Quarry near Somerton.

Paleofauna

The rock is rich in fossil remains from the Jurassic period.  The blue-grey colour is provided by its iron content, enclosed to a large extent in pyrites.

Dinosaurs

Pterosaurs

Fish 
Numerous fish species are known from the Blue Lias and overlying Charmouth Mudstone.

Ichthyosaurs

Plesiosaurs

Insects 
Insect compression fossils are known from the localities of Binton in Warwickshire and Copt Heath near Birmingham.

See also
 White Lias
 List of dinosaur-bearing rock formations

References

External links
"Explore the Jurassic Coast" at the National Trust
The Philpot Museum website
Geology of Whitby
Geology of Lyme Regis Area
Geology of the Wessex Coast
Ham & Doulting Stone Co Ltd
Conservation of Blue lias article
Fossils of the Blue Lias Formation -- A quick guide
Hadspen Quarry Ltd
AR Purnell Ltd
 Blue Lias, Stockton
Jurassic Wales
Triassic Wales
Limestone formations
Shale formations
Geologic formations of the United Kingdom
Stratigraphy of the United Kingdom
Hettangian Stage
Jurassic System of Europe